James Jeffrey Wirth (born February 19, 1990), better known as Jaymes Mansfield, is an American drag queen and TV personality, best known for competing on the ninth season of RuPaul's Drag Race and playing the part of Delia Von Whitewoman in the film The Bitch Who Stole Christmas.

Early life 
Wirth performed as a puppeteer, visual artist and later drag queen in Milwaukee, in 2016 she was cast to appear on RuPaul's Drag Race.

Career 
Jaymes Mansfield was announced as one of the 14 contestants for the ninth season of RuPaul's Drag Race on February 2, 2017. After being safe in episode one, she was placed in the bottom two in the second episode with Kimora Blac and lost the lip sync for the song "Love Shack" by The B-52's, becoming the first queen eliminated. She appeared as a guest for the first challenge in the premiere of season ten of Drag Race. She made another appearance at the season 11 live finale with other alumni. In 2022, Mansfield returned to the show as a guest on the 5th episode of the 14th season, along with Tempest DuJour and Kahmora Hall.

Mansfield created a YouTube channel in 2013, where she frequently uploads videos. In her ongoing series Drag Herstory, she explains the history of drag queens and drag culture. The first episode was available on May 29, 2016.

On September 2, 2019, Mansfield launched her own wig company.

In 2021, Mansfield has also appeared on the YouTube wrestling quiz show "Quizzlemania" and won said quiz show one time.

Discography
As Featured Artist

Filmography

Film

Television

Web series

Music videos

Awards and nominations

References

External links 

1990 births
Living people
American drag queens
American YouTubers
LGBT people from Connecticut
LGBT people from Wisconsin
LGBT YouTubers
People from Madison, Wisconsin
Jaymes Mansfield
20th-century LGBT people
21st-century LGBT people